La Alamedilla is a town and municipality in Spain, in the province of Salamanca, part of the autonomous community of Castile-Leon. It has a population of 209 inhabitants.

The town is close to the border with Portugal, and the traditional local dialect can be considered a variety of Portuguese language. It also bears striking resemblance to the dialect called Fala,  spoken in another Spanish area bordering Portugal, the Xalima Valley. The dialect spoken in La Alamedilla has been classified as a Portuguese, Galician or Extremaduran dialect.

Geography

See also
List of municipalities in Salamanca

References

Municipalities in the Province of Salamanca